The following is a list of all 40 songs for the Lips sequel, Number One Hits. As with the first Lips game, all songs are master tracks. In addition to this, players are able to download a free five-pack of DLC; the contents of this pack are still not revealed to the public, although iNiS has stated that players can customize their DLC pack from a list of songs in the soon to be launched Xbox LIVE Music Channel.

On-disc Songs

Downloadable content

It was announced that previously available downloadable content will be compatible with newer Lips titles.

Each new copy of Lips: Number One Hits has a code so you can download one of three exclusive song packs. These packs are:

 Lips House Party
 LL Cool J – Going Back To Cali
 Bobby Brown – My Prerogative
 Janet Jackson – Nasty
 Paula Abdul – Straight Up
 Montell Jordan – This Is How We Do It

 Lips Hearts and Heartbreak Tour
 James Blunt – 1973
 Daniel Powter – Bad Day
 Robbie Williams – Eternity
 Daniel Bedingfield – If You're Not the One
 Jewel – You Were Meant For Me

 Lips Turn It Up to 11 Tour
 Thirty Seconds to Mars – From Yesterday
 Coldplay – Lost!
 Nickelback – Photograph
 Hoobastank – The Reason
 My Chemical Romance – Welcome to the Black Parade

References

External links 
 Lips - Official site.

Lips (video game)
Lists of songs in music video games